Lester Scheininger is a politician and lawyer in Ontario, Canada. He is best known for serving as president of the Canadian Jewish Congress from 1989-92. Scheininger ran for the Legislative Assembly of Ontario in the 1995 provincial election as a candidate of the Ontario Liberal Party.

Leadership
Scheininger chaired the Canadian Jewish Congress's Ontario region during the 1980s, and argued in favour of public funding of denominational education.

He was chosen as president of the Canadian Jewish Congress in April 1989, succeeding Dorothy Reitman.  During his acceptance speech, Scheininger said that his primary goal was to improve Canada's relationship with Israel.  He argued that Canada's recent upgrade in relations with the Palestine Liberation Organization had "[put] into jeopardy the possibility of Canada providing a useful role in the Middle East process", and said that Israel would have difficulty accepting Canada as an "honest broker" in the future. He said he would promote anti-hate crime laws, and work to mediate disputes between Orthodox, Conservative and Reform communities within Canada.

In June 1989, Scheininger criticized the Canadian government for supporting a United Nations motions that condemned Israel's military actions in the West Bank and Gaza. He supported the Israeli government's decision to kidnap Sheik Abdul-Karim Obeid later that same year, and called for Canada to downgrade its relations with the PLO. Unlike some prominent American Jewish groups, the CJC did not openly criticize Israel's response to the First Intifada in this period.

Scheininger praised Canadian Prime Minister Brian Mulroney for his support of the 1991 Gulf War, and described Saddam Hussein's military attacks on Israeli targets as "diabolical".  After the war, he criticized External Affairs Minister Joe Clark for advocating further dialogue with the PLO.

Scheininger also called for governments in Canada to prosecute Nazi war criminals and persons who promote hatred toward Jews.   He encouraged the Alberta government to initiate a second prosecution against Jim Keegstra in 1991, after Keegstra's first conviction for promoting hatred was quashed.

Scheininger stood down as CJC president in 1992, and was replaced by Irving Abella. In the late 1990s, he chaired the CJC's international affairs committee. He was awarded the Samuel Bronfman Medal in 1998.

Politician
Scheininger nominated Joe Volpe for the Liberal Party of Canada nomination in Eglinton—Lawrence in the 1988 federal election.  Volpe defeated incumbent Member of Parliament Roland de Corneille for the nomination, and was elected in the general election.

Scheininger later defeated former MPP Gino Matrundola, to win the provincial Liberal nomination for Willowdale in the 1995 provincial election.

A 1995 report in the Toronto Star newspaper indicates that he would have been considered for Attorney-General if the Liberals had won the election.  He was defeated by Progressive Conservative incumbent Charles Harnick, as the PCs won a majority government across the province.  Scheininger was 47 years old during the campaign.

Lawyer
In late 1991, Scheininger represented suspected prominent Canadian-Croat Anton Kikas in a high-profile case. Kikas was a Canadian citizen, but the Yugoslavian government considered him to be a Yugoslavian national. 

Scheininger previously worked for the firm of Bresver, Grossman, Scheininger & Davis. In 2006, he provided legal counsel to Liberal leadership candidate Joe Volpe, whom he had nominated eighteen years earlier.

Family 
In 1969 Scheininger married Judy [nee Weiss] and they had three children, Pamela, Stephanie, and Robbie.
Les also has 15 grandchildren.

Footnotes

Ontario Liberal Party candidates in Ontario provincial elections
Living people
Lawyers in Ontario
Canadian Jewish Congress
Jewish Canadian politicians
Place of birth missing (living people)
Year of birth missing (living people)